Olivia Vinall is an English/Belgian actress known for her roles in Apple Tree Yard (2017), The Woman in White (2018) and as Detective Matilda Stone in Queens of Mystery in 2019.

Early life 
Olivia Vinall was born in Brussels, Belgium but spent part of her childhood in London  and Washington DC, .Vinall lived most of her early life in Belgium, attending secondary school there, moving to Washington DC for five years.

Vinall studied drama at the University of East Anglia and graduated in 2010  with a First Class BA (Hons) Degree in Drama before going on to further her education at the Drama Studio London. Vinall has performed at the National Student Drama Festival (NSDF) and is an NSDF alumna.

Theatre
In 2010, Vinall's first appearance on stage was in a production of Romeo and Juliet. Further theatre work 2013 included playing Desdemona in Othello,  and in 2014, Vinall starred as Cordelia in Sam Mendes's King Lear at The Royal National Theatre. In 2015, Vinall took centre stage again at National Theatre Live in Tom Stoppard's play The Hard Problem as Hilary.
In 2015, Vinall was nominated for Best Supporting Performance for playing Nina in Anton Chekhov's The Seagull where she performed at Chichester Festival Theatre and when the production was transferred to the National Theatre.

TV and Film
Vinall's first television appearance was as Cassie Lock in the episode Cupcakes in Doctors in 2011. 
In 2013, she starred as the heroine Juliette in the rock musical Gutterdämmerung alongside rock stars such as Iggy Pop, Grace Jones, Lemmy and Slash. In 2017, Vinall starred in the BBC's Apple Tree Yard, where she played Carrie alongside Emily Watson. Vinall also starred as Arlette in the 2017 ITV television drama  Maigret in Montmartre opposite Rowan Atkinson who played Maigret.

In 2018, she starred in the Amma Asante-directed romantic war drama arthouse film Where Hands Touch playing Hermine, a Jewish girl in Nazi Germany, alongside Abbie Cornish and Christopher Eccleston.
In the same year, Vinall played two characters; asylum patient Anne Catherick and also Laura Fairlie in the BBC period drama adaptation of Wilkie Collins’ The Woman in White, alongside Charles Dance. 
In 2019, Vinall took lead role as Detective Matilda Stone in three episodes of the Acorn TV comedy-drama murder-mystery series Queens of Mystery

Vinall takes lead role as Sophie in Hermione Sylvester directed short film Fuel which has its international premiere at the 2020 Arrow London FrightFest Film Festival, an event which was held online because of the COVID-19 pandemic. Vinall played the role of Julia Blythe, the Private Secretary to the Prime Minister (played by Helen McCrory) in the BBC political thriller television series Roadkill in 2020.

Vinall played a main role of Stella in the modern romantic film A Beautiful Curse in 2021, where she is struck down by a form of sleeping disorder. The Martin Garde Abildgaard directed film premiered at the Cinequest Film & Creativity Festival in 2021.

Filmography

Film

Live Streaming Theatre

Television

Audio

Video Games

Awards and nominations

References

External links 
 
 Olivia Vinall Instagram
 Olivia Vinall Spotlight
 Bespoke Voice Agency - Olivia Vinall

Living people
21st-century English actresses
People from London
Actresses from London
Actresses from Brussels
English television actresses
English stage actresses
English film actresses
Belgian film actresses
Belgian television actresses
Belgian expatriates in England
Alumni of the Drama Studio London
Alumni of the University of East Anglia
Year of birth missing (living people)